Pathemari is a 2015 Indian Malayalam-language period drama film written and directed by Salim Ahamed and starring Mammootty in the lead role, with a supporting cast that includes Jewel Mary, Siddique, Sreenivasan, Salim Kumar, Shaheen Siddique, Viji Chandrasekhar, and Joy Mathew. The plot follows the life of Pallikkal Narayanan (Mammootty) who migrated to the Middle-East in the early 1960s, when the Kerala Gulf boom was just beginning.

Resul Pookutty handles the sound recording, while music is composed by Bijibal and cinematography is done by Madhu Ambat. The principal photography began in October 2014. The film was shot in Kerala and Middle East.
Distributed by Eros International, Pathemari released on 9 October 2015 received critical praise. Pathemari was selected for the Indiwood Panorama Competition section at the 2nd edition of Indiwood Carnival 2016 in Hyderabad.

Plot

The film begins with a young Narayanan and Moideen along with a group of men travelling by Dhow for Dubai to lead a better life. Launchi Velayudhan is responsible for shifting of the young men to the Gulf illegally through the sea route. In Dubai both Narayanan and Moideen work as construction labourers. They reside along with other labourers. They sacrifice their happiness and work very hard to earn money.

Narayanan visits his home regularly and gifts his family and friends with imported items. During one of his visits Narayanan informs his wife that he would not return to Dubai and would settle in Kerala & earn money by starting a business. However Narayanan realises that his family values money more than him and his wife is also conscious of losing her social image of being a "dubai man's wife". Finally Narayanan returns to Dubai.

In the meanwhile, Narayanan's widowed sister Nirmala's daughter (both residing in Narayanan's house) is not getting married since she has no money or property in her name. Chandraettan offers Narayanan a land of 8 cents and in turn asks him to transfer his share of the property house to Nirmala's daughter. Chandraettan is of the opinion that since Narayanan is rich he can build a plush house for himself. Narayan happily obliges for the same. After few months Chandraettan again informs Narayanan that Nirmala's son in law would like to rent the house to earn extra income. Narayanan is upset since in the same house his wife and children reside. Narayanan informs that he would pay monthly rent to Nirmala's son in law.

Years pass by and Narayanan's children are now young adults. Even his children are only interested in Narayanan's money and not concerned about him.

Finally one day Narayanan passes away and his dead body is flown to Kerala. Still the family doesn't show any respect for the departed soul. After the last rituals are performed the family see a TV interview of Narayanan. Narayanan informs that he is the most successful person since because of him, his family is happy and not hungry. He never informed his family of the various hardships faced by him and he never felt tired working hard since he was earning for his family. He is satisfied when the people smile and if he is responsible for their happiness. Narayan's last wish is to be again be reborn as Narayanan again and have the same family and friends & make them happy.

Cast

 Mammootty as Pallikkal Narayanan
 Sreenivasan as Moideen
 Jewel Mary as Nalini
 Siddique as Launchi Velayudhan
 Joy Mathew as Chandrettan. Narayanan's elder brother  
 Salim Kumar as Narayanan's Father
 Rohit Menon as Young Narayanan
 Santhosh Keezhattoor as Majeed
 Shaheen Siddique as Satheesh
 Viji Chandrasekhar as Narayanan's mother
 Anju Aravind as Pushpa
 Sruthi Lakshmi as Smitha,Nirmala's daughter
 Saju Navodaya as Narayanan's roommate
 Gokulan as Narayanan's Relative
 Parvathi Menon
 Anu Joseph as Nirmala
 Jennifer Antony as Girija
 Adv. Hashik TK as himself
 Aakash Santhosh as Narayanan's son
 Mithun Ramesh as Najeeb,Moideen's son
Nyla Usha as herself

Production

Development
In November 2013, Salim Ahamed announced that he will be directing a film that deals with the Gulf and various aspects of it. And it will star Mammootty in the lead, in his second collaboration with Ahmed after Kunjananthante Kada (2013). Madhu Ambat was reported to handle the cinematography with the sound recording done by Resul Pookutty. It was in 2013 that Ahamed narrated the story before Mammootty. He expressed the interest, and the total screenplay was finished in a homework of span one year.

In September 2014, Jewel Mary a television anchor was cast as heroine, in her feature film debut as Nalini, while Mammootty's character was revealed to be named Pallickal Narayanan. Sreenivasan was also confirmed to play the role of Moidheen, while Siddique, Salim Kumar, Joy Mathew and Yavanika Gopalakrishnan were signed for other prominent roles. Actress Viji Chandrasekhar was confirmed to play protagonist's mother. Shaheen Siddique was selected to play Mammootty's son. Salim Ahamed had earlier denied the rumours that Suresh Gopi and Manju Warrier would be part of the cast.

Filming and post-production

Principal photography of the film commenced in October 2014 and was completed by April 2015, in three schedules in and around Khorfakhan, Fujaira, Dubai, Chettuva, Nattika, Thriprayar and Bepur. In March third week, Mammootty joined with the crew for a five-day schedule of filming  in UAE, which was mainly held in Bur Dubai, Jumeirah and Rola Square in Sharjah.
Jothish Shankar designed the art for the film, collaborating with the director third time. The ninety percent of the scenes in Pathemari are sets, according to Jyothish. The set for Mumbai Airport of 1980 was erected at the parking area of Greater Cochin Development Authority Building in Marine Drive, Kochi. Every scenes taking place abroad except the outdoors were shot in Eranakulam. The Khader Hotel where the expatriates were used to lend food was also erected at a studio in Kochi. The house was erected at Thriprayar. The scenes in the sloop were shot adopting a water-craft from Beypore.
It was during the shoot of Kunjananthante Kada that Resul Pookutty, the Academy Award winning sound designer, was roped in the project by Salim Ahamed. For the film, sounds of air conditioners, traffic and its changing over the time in the Gulf were used by Resul in order to portray the development and transformation of the surroundings there. He says that he did the sound design in such a way same as that of the images are arranged in the film, that "the past is represented colourfully and the present is monochromatic."
It was real sounds that used  for the scene in which the protagonist's first
voyage aboard a sloop is featured. Resul used the 'gurgling sound of water' on the background for the scene, which, he says, the director had said "was spot on as it conveyed the loneliness and entrapment of the voyagers beautifully."
It was only three changes that the director needed to suggest to Resul in the final track of the sounds designed for the film.

Marketing
The production team released a making video of the film which features the creation of the 'storm' that appeared in a prominent scene in the film, where a group of youngsters are migrating illegally to Middle East by crossing the sea on a sloop and are facing severe difficulties. The video, also featuring the VFX used for the scene, was uploaded by Mammootty on his official Facebook page on 27 October, which IB Times said "has gone viral, with more than 51,000 social media users
watching it at the time of reporting." In an event organised by World Malayali Council, some emigrants who have gone to Gulf during the 1960s period aboard the dhows were honoured by the makers of the film.

Soundtrack

The music was released by Eros Music on 14 September 2015. 15 Gulf expatriates from Kerala during the Gulf boom were specially invited for the audio launch.

On 18 September, the first video song "Padiyirangunnu" was released. The Hindu included the song "Padiyirangunnu" in their weekend top-five and commented: "Bijibal makes the phenomenally appropriate decision to rope in Hariharan to sing this incredibly soulful melody. It seems — given it evokes strong memories of Karnan's ‘Ullathil Nalla Ullam’ — to be set to Chakravakam raga. The result is sheer magic, since the mellow tune goes really well with Hariharan's deep, sonorous voice."

Release
After several postponements, on 9 October 2015, the film was released in 64 centers in Kerala. The distribution rights were acquired by Eros International, marking their second venture in Malayalam after Life of Josutty. The film's premiere in Qatar was held at an event organised by Qubis Events in Doha, during which Malayali emigrants who have been in Qatar for decades were honoured. As part of the 100 days celebration, "Pathemari" was re-released in more than 10 theatres in Kerala on 8 January. The distribution rights of Pathemari were brought by Surya TV.

Plagiarism allegations
A UAE based NRI Moidutty filed a complaint in the Additional Sessions Court, Eranakulam against the release of the film, stating that the director Salim Ahmed plagiarised his story titled 'Swapnageham'. In July 2015, the release of the film was stayed by the Ernakulam Additional Sessions Court. Salim Ahamed reacted to the allegation saying "It is said to be that about three people have come up with similar claims, one from Irikkur, Kannur and another one who has conducted a press conference about it in Muscat." The director also pointed out that his debut film Adaminte Makan Abu had also faced similar allegations, but it died down when the movie was released. "Pathemari will be felt for each NRI malayalis as their own story, but it is not about a single individual. We will try to solve the plagiarism issue legally," said Salim. Later in an interview Salim Ahamed furthermore clarified the issue said: "Upon reading the story for clarification, I could see that the accuser's own work is a plagiarized tale based on the story titled Swapnangalil Ninnu Swapnangalilekku Oru Kabir, written by T V Kochubava, decades ago. As we pointed it out, the court happened to check it and the observation was included in the final verdict, which was in our favour. We are continuing with the case as false allegations were made."

Reception
The film received positive reviews. It was reported that the film was among the five films shortlisted for India's submission for the Academy Award for Best Foreign Language Film, by the jury headed by Amol Palekar. Citing film director and jury member K. Madhu, Malayala Manorama reported that the film missed the submission to the Marathi film Court in the final round.
However, Salim Ahamed talked about the news in an interview with The Times of India that, "I am a filmmaker who makes movies for the Malayali audience and tell stories of their lives, and those outside its realm aren't my focus group. Being considered for Oscars is good enough."

On 12 October, it was reported that the film has been selected to be screened under the category of 'Malayalam Cinema Today' at the 20th edition of International Film Festival of Kerala, which is held at Thiruvananthapuram in December 2015.

Critical reception
Sujatha S of Mathrubhumi called the film "An ode to Gulf Malayali" and appreciated the cinematography, editing and sound mixing by Resul Pookutty, she said "The dialogues on many occasions in the first half sound dramatic, though there were gems of dialogues too". 
Rating 4 out of 5, Anu James of International Business Times called the performance of Mammootty as one of his career-best and wrote: "As it is a familiar story for many of us, there is no suspense element in it, but we still sit firmly on our seats just to see what happens next." S.R. Praveen of The Hindu wrote "A familiar story, a familiar setting and even actors in predictable roles – on paper, there is nothing really going for Pathemari . But still much can be achieved with a script that shines light on previously unseen details."
Rejath RG of Kerala Kaumudi also said, "Salim Ahmed excels as the writer and director in
Pathemari and considering the fact that it was such a memorable experience."
Behindwoods rated 3/5 and stated, "As far as the narration goes, the film takes you through familiar territory, like what we have seen in films like Arabikkatha, but let's just say that Pathemari is highly laced with empathy. At the end of the film, you can't help feel empathetic about the suffering and chronic homesickness that every Gulf Malayali or any expatriate would be going through for that matter."
Paresh C
Palicha writing
for Rediff.com gave 5/5 and
wrote, "The director tries to infuse new life to the dated theme by employing flashbacks and flash forwards, bringing in a larger social perspective rather than restricting it to one person." Rating 3/5, Indiaglitz described the technical aspects as "pretty okay" saying "A more realistic dialogues and novelty factor would have lifted the movie to a new level" and concluded, "The way the movie ends is also quite nice and this adds to the overall good." Praising performances, cinematography and music, G. Ragesh of Malayala Manorama rated the film 3.25/5 and said, "Through episodes that the viewers can easily associate with, Salim tells the tale of the Malayali migrant life in a less dramatic but compelling narrative. The film doesn't have the flavours for a commercial flick. Nor does it compromise anywhere to satiate the tastes of the so-called critics. In short, it's a film made for all."

Box office
The film was commercial success. The film collected  on its opening day. The film completed 125 days in theatres across Kerala, it crossed four weeks in 60 screens in the United Arab Emirates, and completed five weekends in the United States of America by grossing 18.04 lakhs in its final run.

Accolades 
National Film Awards
Best Feature Film in Malayalam (2015)

Asiavision Awards
 Best Movie on Social Welfare
 Best Critically Acclaimed Movie
 Best New Face – Jewel Mary
 Best Music Director – Bijibal

Ramu Kariat Film Awards
Best Film
Best Direction – Salim Ahamed
Best Screenplay – Salim Ahamed
Best Actor – Mammootty
Best Sound Design – Resul Pookutty
Best Cinematography – Madhu Ambat
 Best Supporting Actor – Siddique
Best New Face (male) -Shaheen Siddique
Best New Face (female) – Jewel Mary
Best Film Editor – Vijay Shankar
Best Art Director – Jyothish Shankar
Best Costume Design – Sameera Saneesh
Best Makeup – Pattanam Rasheed

Flowers Indian Film Awards
Best Film
Best Direction – Salim Ahamed
Best Screenplay – Salim Ahamed
Best Actor – Mammootty
Best Sound Design – Resul Pookutty

Filmfare Awards

 Best Film
 Best Actor - Mammootty

References

External links
 
  

2015 films
Indian drama films
Films shot in Kochi
Films shot in Thrissur
Films shot in Kozhikode
Films shot in Dubai
Best Malayalam Feature Film National Film Award winners
2010s Malayalam-language films